Lake Pukaki is the largest of three roughly parallel alpine lakes running north–south along the northern edge of the Mackenzie Basin on New Zealand's South Island. The others are Lakes Tekapo and Ohau. All three lakes were formed when the terminal moraines of receding glaciers blocked their respective valleys, forming moraine-dammed lakes. The Alps2Ocean mountain bike trail follows the edge of Lake Pukaki for part of its length.

Geography
The glacial feed to the lakes gives them a distinctive blue colour, created by glacial flour, the extremely finely ground rock particles from the glaciers.
Lake Pukaki covers an area of 178.7 km², and the surface elevation of the lake normally  ranges from 518.2 to 532 metres above sea level.

The lake is fed at its northern end by the braided Tasman River, which has its source in the Tasman and Hooker Glaciers, close to Aoraki / Mount Cook. To the west of Lake Pukaki lies the Ben Ohau mountain range with Ben Dhu (1607m) and Betty Hill (1601m) closest to the lake. On the eastern side there is some farmland on the flatter contours between Lake Pukaki and Lake Tekapo.

Good views of the taller mountains in Aoraki /Mount Cook National Park, 70 kilometres to the north can be had from the southern shore of the lake.

Tahr Statue 

There is a  life size bronze statue of a Himalayan Tahr standing upon a boulder  near the visitor centre on the southern shores of Lake Pukaki, This was the site of a protest  by hunters fighting against the Department of Conservation’s controversial tahr culling programme in 2020.

Hydroelectricity
The lake is now  part of the Waitaki hydroelectric scheme.
The lake's original outflow was at its southern end, into the Pukaki River.
The outflow has been dammed, and canals carry water from Lake Pukaki and Lake Ohau through the Ohau A power station to Lake Ruataniwha.
Pukaki is also fed by the waters of Lake Tekapo, which are diverted through a canal to a power station on Pukaki's eastern shore (Tekapo B station). The lake has been raised twice to increase storage capacity (9m in 1952, and 37m in 1976 ), submerging Five Pound Note Island, which once appeared on New Zealand's five pound note. The current lake has an operating range of 13.8 m (the level within which it can be artificially raised or lowered), giving it an energy storage capacity of 1,595 GWh. Along with Lake Tekapo's 770 GWh storage, it provides over half New Zealand's hydroelectricity storage capacity. In September 2012, Environment Canterbury approved a change in conditions of Meridian Energy's resource consent controlling the water levels and flows of Lake Pukaki. The change allows Meridian to lower the lake a further five metres from the minimum level of 518m above sea level in the event of an energy crisis.

Nearby settlements
The closest town to Lake Pukaki is Twizel,  to the south of the lake and Tekapo is 47 km (32 minutes drive) to the northeast.  skirts the southern end of the lake, and  runs north along the length of its western shore, to Mount Cook Village in the Aoraki / Mount Cook National Park.

The nearby Pukaki Scientific Reserve is home to the Nationally Endangered moth species Izatha psychra.

Road Safety 
State Highway 8 runs along the edge of Lake Pukaki. A number of crashes have occurred here as drivers have come around a blind corner, seen Lake Pukaki and wanted to stop at an unsafe location to enjoy the view.

2020 Fire 
A significant scrub fire burnt on the shores of Lake Pukaki in August 2020. Both State Highway 8 and SH80 were closed. Firefighters fought the fire with 14 monsoon bucket equipped helicopters, two fixed-wing aircraft, and 10 fire engines. The fire destroyed 3500 hectares and took 12 days to put out. $1 million was spent fighting it. Environmentalists believe that the spread of wilding pines in the Mackenzie District along with the dry conditions allowed the scrub fire to become so destructive.

Pukaki Scientific Reserve 
The Pukaki Scientific Reserve is a small scientific reserve located on the western side of Lake Pukaki next to the Mount Cook road. It is only 32 hectares in size. The Pukaki Scientific Reserve is home to the endangered Izatha psychra moth. The Lake Pukaki area is also home to the "Data Deficient" fly species Anabarhynchus albipennis.

References

Further reading

External links

 Department of Conservation – Mackenzie Basin short walks



Lakes of Canterbury, New Zealand